Northwest Ohio, or Northwestern Ohio, consists of multiple counties in the northwestern corner of the US state of Ohio. This area borders Lake Erie, Southeast Michigan, and northeastern Indiana. Some areas are also considered the Black Swamp area. The Toledo metropolitan area is part of the region.

Northwest Ohio's population in 2000 was 1,639,144 and is declining, specifically in the northern regions (counties shaded in the darker blue and Allen County). However, southern areas, such as Marion and Morrow Counties, and the City of Findlay are growing.

Largest municipalities
Toledo is the principal city of Northwest Ohio. Most of the region's television channels and radio stations are licensed in Toledo, Perrysburg or nearby Bowling Green. Though Toledo is an industrial city, Northwest Ohio is primarily agricultural with small centers of commerce distributed across region. Since the 1970s, the population of Lucas County and the Toledo metropolitan area has declined, though Wood and Hancock counties have had moderate population growth.

Places considered within northwest Ohio

These places are or may be classified as being in Northwestern Ohio, depending on the definition being applied:

Counties and county seats

Other cities, villages, and townships
If a city is a county seat, it has been listed above according to the county in which it lies.  Many of the cities, townships, and villages in Northwest Ohio are clustered in the Toledo MSA.  This list is incomplete.

Cities

Villages

Townships

Toledo area townships
 Monclova Township
 Perrysburg Township
 Springfield Township
 Sylvania Township
 Washington Township

Other places
 Nankin
 Nova
 Sullivan
Ridgeville

Extreme Northwest Ohio

Extreme Northwest Ohio, or Far Northwestern Ohio, is a portion of Northwest Ohio best known as the Great Black Swamp area due to its natural history. The counties of Defiance, Fulton, Henry, Paulding, Putnam, Van Wert, and Williams in the state of Ohio are usually classified as Extreme Northwest Ohio. 

According to the 2000 Census, the population of this portion of NW Ohio is 234,660. When Allen and Hancock counties are included, the population is 414,428. Just like any other region, there is no universally agreed-upon line for Northwestern Ohio, as the entire area is defined differently by the opinions of multiple people.

Principal Cities

Transportation

Airports

Toledo Express Airport (TOL), in suburban Swanton, is the largest airport in northwest Ohio. Toledo Express is served by seven major passenger airlines, and has been named one of the five best small airports in the Midwest.  Toledo Express is also a major air cargo center, serving as the international hub for BAX Global. Toledo Express has begun a $22 million renovation project; As of 2007, the airport has expanded and renovated the central gate area of its single terminal, and is seeking an airline to offer direct service to New York City.

Toledo Express also hosts the corporate flight departments of Owens-Illinois, Owens-Corning, Pilkington, and Dana Holding Corporation. Grand Aire Express offers charter and air taxi services from its base at the airport.  In education, the airport is a base of operations for FlightSafety International and Toledo Public Schools' aviation program, with flight instruction also offered by the airport's two fixed-base operators, who also provide fuel, repair, and storage for general aviation aircraft. Additionally, Toledo Express is a base for F-16 fighter jets of the Ohio Air National Guard, which has provided the airport additional funding for runway lengthening and safety enhancements.

Detroit Metropolitan Airport to the north, Port Columbus International Airport to the southeast, and Cleveland Hopkins International Airport to the east are the major or hub airports serving residents of Northwest Ohio. Detroit Metro is a "fortress hub" for Delta Air Lines and offers both domestic and international flights. Cleveland Hopkins is a hub for United Airlines and offers both domestic and international flights.

Charter and air taxi service is also available at several smaller airports, such as Toledo Metcalf Field, Findlay Airport, and Lima Allen County Airport. General aviation users can also land at any one of approximately 40 public-use airports (both publicly and privately owned) in Northwest Ohio.

KFDY (Findlay Airport) has both the second and third largest runway in Northwest Ohio with runway 18/36 at 6449 x 100 ft and runway 7/25 at 5883 x 100 ft. Runway 18/36 is capable of allowing aircraft such as the Boeing 767-200 to land and then take-off at MTOW if needed. KTOL (Toledo Express) has the largest runway in Northwest Ohio at 10,600 x 150 ft, making it capable of handling nearly any aircraft at MTOW.

Roads
Interstate 90 runs east-west through the upper part of Northwest Ohio. Interstate 75 runs from the Michigan border, through Toledo, south to Findlay, Lima, and to southwest Ohio.

Railroads
Amtrak serves the passenger train, the Lake Shore Limited in Bryan in the Extreme Northwest. Martin Luther King Jr. Plaza in Toledo and Sandusky host Amtrak's Lake Shore Limited and Capitol Limited.

Notable people

 Neil Armstrong, the first person to walk on the moon, was born in Wapakoneta in Auglaize County, and spent time as a child in Upper Sandusky.  The Neil Armstrong Air and Space Museum is named to honor his achievements.
 Singer and Grammy winner Anita Baker was born in Toledo in Lucas County.
 Figure Skater Alissa Czisny is from Bowling Green in Wood County.  She won a bronze medal at the 2007 United States Figure Skating Championships in Spokane.
 Actor Jamie Farr, best known as Corporal Maxwell Klinger from the TV series M*A*S*H, is from Toledo.
 Former president Gerald Ford's wife Betty Ford lived in Toledo for a short period of time in the 1940s with her ex-husband before marrying Gerald Ford.
 Stephen Hadley, National Security Advisor to President George W. Bush, was born in Toledo and lived in Ottawa Hills, Ohio, until his family moved to the Cleveland area.
 Olympic Figure Skater Scott Hamilton is from Bowling Green in Wood County.  He won a gold medal at the 1984 Olympic Games in Sarajevo, Bosnia-Herzegovina.
 Rutherford B. Hayes, 19th president of the United States, lived in Fremont, Ohio.
Kurt Rock, Rapper and record producer born in Defiance, & from Continental
 Actress Katie Holmes is from Sylvania in Lucas County.
 2006 Indianapolis 500 winner, 3 time Indy Car champion, and current NASCAR driver Sam Hornish Jr. was born in Bryan, grew up in Defiance, and now lives in Napoleon.
 Children's television show host Frances Horwich, also known as "Miss Frances", was born in Ottawa, Putnam County.
 American Atheists founder Madalyn Murray O'Hair graduated from Rossford High School.
 Pittsburgh Steelers' quarterback and Super Bowl champion Ben Roethlisberger is from Findlay in Hancock County.
 Teresa Brewer, a popular jazz and traditional pop music singer, was a native of Toledo.
 Guitarist Tom Scholz of the rock band Boston is from Ottawa Hills.
 Noted feminist Gloria Steinem is from Toledo.  Her grandmother, Pauline Steinem, was the first woman (and thus, the first Jewish woman) elected to the Toledo Board of Education.
 Carl Karcher, founder of Carl's Jr. Restaurants (Hardee's) was born in Upper Sandusky.

References

External links

Regions of Ohio